Peter Steigerwald is an American comic book artist primarily known for his work as a colorist and his work at Aspen Comics. He has also worked in inking, writing, and graphic design.

Career
Steigerwald first worked with Top Cow Productions, colouring covers and interiors and designing most of their comic book productions. Peter also painted a number of trading cards for such popular Top Cow comics as Witchblade and Fathom. In 2003, Peter, along with many other Top Cow artists and staff, moved away from Top Cow with Michael Turner to form a new comic company known as Aspen Comics. There, Peter took on a much larger role, acting as Vice President of Publishing, as well as continuing to use his graphic design and colouring skills.

Since joining Aspen, Steigerwald has colored a great deal of comics, covers, and pin-ups for his co-worker, Michael Turner. His work with Aspen has also led him to do cover colors for many DC and Marvel comics.

Since 2010, he has been the main colorist for Joe Benitez' Lady Mechanika steampunk series.

Steigerwald has also worked on the Heroes graphic novels through his work at Aspen. He started off as just a colourist but has moved onto drawing the novels too.

He is currently co-owner of Aspen Comics.

Bibliography

Colorist

Aspen MLT 
Michael Turner Presents: Aspen, miniseries, #1-3 (covers, 2003)
Aspen Splash Spectacular (covers, 2006–08)
Aspen Seasons:
Fall (cover, 2005)
Spring (cover, 2005)
Summer (cover, 2006)
Winter (cover, 2009)
Aspen Sketchbook #1
Soulfire, vol. 1, #0-10 (covers & interiors, 2004–09)
Soulfire, vol. 2, #0-8 (covers, 2009–11)
Soulfire, vol. 3, #0-2 (covers, 2011)
Soulfire: Chaos Reign, miniseries, #0-3 (covers, 2006–07)
Soulfire: Dying of the Light, miniseries, #0-5 (covers, 2005)
Worlds of Aspen #1-4, 2010 (covers, 2006–10)
Lady Mechanika, vol. 1, #0-3 (covers, interiors, & logo design, 2010–12)

Benitez Productions 
Lady Mechanika, vol. 1, #4-5 (covers & interiors, 2015)
Lady Mechanika: The Tablet of Destinies, vol. 2, #1-6 (covers, 2015)
Lady Mechanika: The Lost Boys of West Abbey, #1-2 (covers & interiors, 2016)
Lady Mechanika: La Dama de la Muerte, #1-3 (covers & interiors, 2016)

DC 
Action Comics #812-813 (covers & interiors, 2004)
Adventures of Superman #625-626 (covers & interiors, 2004)
Justice League of America, vol. 4 #0, 2 (covers, 2006)
Rann-Thanagar War, miniseries, #1-6 (covers, 2005)
Supergirl, vol. 4, #1-3, 5, 8-13 (covers & interiors, 2005–07)
Superman, vol. 2, #202-203 (covers & interiors, 2004)Superman/Batman #8-13 (full colors); #26 (among other colorists, 2004-06)Teen Titans, vol. 3, #1 (variant cover, 2003)Wildstorm: Winter Special (2004)

 Image Cyblade/Ghost Rider #1Darkness #20, 25Ekos PreviewEVO #1Fathom, vol. 1, #1-14 (1998-2002)Tomoe/Witchblade: Fire Sermon #1Witchblade #61

 Marvel Battlestar Galactica #1 (cover)Civil War, miniseries, #1-3, 5, 7 (variant covers, 2006-07)Ms. Marvel, vol. 2, #1 (variant cover, 2006)Ultimate Comics: XWolverine: Origins #1 (variant cover, 2006)

Cover ArtistLady Mechanika, vol. 1, #4-5, (Steigerwald Limited Exclusive Edition for Rupp's Comics, 2015)Lady Mechanika: La Dama de la Muerte, #1 (Steigerwald Limited Exclusive Edition for Rupp's Comics, 2016)Kato, vol. 1, #4, (Cover A, with Joe Benitez)Spider-Man/Red Sonja'', vol. 1, #1-5, (All Covers and Variants, with Michael Turner)

Inker
Aspen Seasons: Fall 2005
Aspen Seasons: Summer 2006
Aspen Sketchbook #1
Nine Volt #4

Penciller
Aspen Seasons: Fall 2005
Aspen Seasons: Summer 2006

Writer
Aspen Seasons: Fall 2005
Aspen Seasons: Summer 2006

Notes

References

External links

Interview with Peter Steigerwald at lotsofinterviews.com 12/5/08
Peter is interviewed by The Other Pete from Pete's Basement at 2009 NYC Comic Con Time Stamp: 10:15

Living people
American comics artists
Comics colorists
Year of birth missing (living people)